This lists the list articles of disasters involving Indonesia

List of lists
 Indonesian tsunami, list of
 List of disasters in Indonesia
 List of earthquakes in Indonesia
 List of natural disasters in Indonesia

See also
 List of volcanoes in Indonesia